A coloring book is a type of book containing line art.

Coloring Book or Colouring Book may also refer to:

 Coloring Book (mixtape), a 2016 mixtape by Chance the Rapper
 Coloring Book (Glassjaw EP), a 2011 EP by Glassjaw
 Coloring Book, a 2012 EP by Buck Owens
 Coloring Book (Oh My Girl EP), a 2017 EP by Oh My Girl

See also 
 Color book, in diplomatic history, an officially sanctioned collection of diplomatic correspondence and other documents published by a government for educational or political reasons, or to promote the government position on current or past events